The Bishop of Buckingham is an episcopal title used by a suffragan bishop of the Church of England Diocese of Oxford, in the Province of Canterbury, England. The title takes its name from the historic county town of Buckingham; the See was erected under the Suffragans Nomination Act 1888, by Order in Council dated 22 November 1913. The bishops suffragan of Buckingham have been area bishops since the Oxford area scheme was founded in 1984.

List of bishops

References

External links
 Crockford's Clerical Directory - Listings

 
Anglican suffragan bishops in the Diocese of Oxford